Abgarm District is a district (bakhsh) in Avaj County, Qazvin Province, Iran. At the 2006 census, its population was 15,823, in 4,130 families.  The District has one city: Abgarm.   The District has two rural districts (dehestan): Abgarm Rural District, and Kharaqan-e Sharqi Rural District.

References 

Districts of Qazvin Province
Avaj County